Tapuz (lit. "Orange fruit") or Tapuz Anashim (lit. "Orange - People"), is an Israeli Web portal, especially known for its Internet forums, and other web media such as BlogTV.

References

External links
 
TIM survey: "Globes" top financial site from office, Globes, 20 July 2009, An article on a survey that shows Tapuz among the 10 big web media in Israel.

Online companies of Israel
Israeli brands